Buir Lake is a freshwater lake that straddles the border between Mongolia and China. It lies within the Buir Lake Depression. 
The Chinese city of Hulunbuir is named after both this lake and Hulun Lake, which lies entirely on the Chinese side of the border in Inner Mongolia.

In 1388, Ming forces under Lan Yu won a major victory over the Northern Yuan on the Buir Lake region. Northern Yuan ruler Tögüs Temür tried to escape but was killed shortly afterwards.

References

External links

http://photojournal.jpl.nasa.gov/catalog/PIA03701

Lakes of Mongolia
Lakes of Inner Mongolia
China–Mongolia border
International lakes of Asia
Ramsar sites in Mongolia